The West German Indoor Athletics Championships was an annual indoor track and field competition organised by the German Athletics Association, which served as the national championship for the sport in West Germany. Typically held over two days in February during the German winter, it was first held in 1954. 

The event was contested separately from the East German Indoor Athletics Championships until 1991, when the German Indoor Athletics Championships was held as the first Unified Germany championships.

Events
The following athletics events featured as standard on the West German Indoor Championships programme:

 Sprint: 60 m, 200 m, 400 m
 Distance track events: 800 m, 1500 m, 3000 m
 Hurdles: 60 m hurdles
 Jumps: long jump, triple jump (men only), high jump, pole vault (men only)
 Throws: shot put

Prior to 1980, the 60 metres was occasionally replaced by a 50 metres race. Similarly, the 60 metres hurdles was sometimes held as a 50 metres hurdles or 55 metres hurdles event in the early years of the competition. Combined events were briefly held with a men's heptathlon and women's pentathlon featuring from 1973–75. Racewalking was also an infrequent sport, with a men's 10,000 m walk being on the programme from 1969 to 1975. At the last edition in 1990, a men's 5000 m walk and women's 3000 m walk were held.

The 200 metres first appeared in 1965, before becoming a standard event in 1968. The women's 400 metres was first held in 1961, followed by the additions of a 1500 metres in 1969. A women's 3000 metres was contested during 1974–76 and became a standard event in 1987. Women did not compete in the triple jump or pole vault during the lifetime of the meeting.

Editions

References 

Athletics competitions in West Germany
National indoor athletics competitions
Recurring sporting events established in 1964
1954 establishments in West Germany
February sporting events
Athletics Indoor
Defunct athletics competitions